Robert Dadds (born 20 January 1992) is an English male professional squash player. He achieved his highest career ranking of 186 on November, 2017 during the 2017 PSA World Tour.

References 

1992 births
Living people
English male squash players
People from Huntingdon